St Brendan-Shaw College is a  co-educational Catholic college for students in grades 7–12. It is located in Devonport on the North-West Coast of Tasmania in Australia. The college has around about 700 students.

History
In 1960, the Edmund Rice Christian Brothers established St. Brendan's College for boys in James Street, Devonport. It was a college for boys up to Year 10.

In 1969 Shaw College, for girls, was established adjacent to St Brendan's College in Devonport. Shaw College was a Catholic Girls School established by the Sisters of St. Joseph. Shaw College was named after Fr. Shaw from the Roman Catholic Archdiocese of Hobart who was the first Parish Priest of Devonport. By agreement with St Brendan’s College a certain degree of co-instruction was arranged at Years 9 and 10.

In 1972, by agreement of the Archdiocese, the Christian Brothers and the Sisters of St Joseph appointed one Board of Management (Devonport Regional Catholic College Board of Management) and in 1981 Br Reg Long was appointed Principal of the co-educational ‘St Brendan-Shaw College’.

The College logo combines the logos of St. Brendan’s and Shaw Colleges, or at least elements from each. The barque of St. Brendan symbolises missionary endeavour, while the 12 pointed star on the sail is taken from the Shaw badge where it represented "Light from Knowledge".

Senior secondary (Year 11 and 12) classes were introduced in 1990 and the school became the regional Catholic secondary co-educational college. Today it is a co-educational college for years 7-12.

Sport 
St Brendan-Shaw College is a member of the Sports Association of Tasmanian Independent Schools (SATIS).

SATIS premierships 
St Brendan-Shaw College has won the following SATIS premierships.

Boys:

 Basketball (2) - 2012, 2013

Girls:

 Basketball - 2017
 Netball (3) - 1996, 1999, 2000
 Rowing - 2021
 Softball (2) - 1994, 2008

Notable alumni 
 AFL Footballers Grant Birchall, Jade Rawlings, Brady Rawlings, Ben Brown and Matthew Richardson.
 Cyclists Luke Ockerby, and Sam Minehan
 Stephanie Williams - Under 17 & 19 National Champion, Australian Rowing Team member and Ohio State scholarship holder. (Rowing)
 Ben Kiely, partner at King & Wood Mallesons

See also

 List of schools in Tasmania
 Education in Tasmania
 Roman Catholic Archdiocese of Hobart
 Catholic education in Australia

References

External links

 School website
 Catholic Education Tasmania website

Catholic secondary schools in Tasmania
Devonport, Tasmania
Educational institutions established in 1981
1981 establishments in Australia